The 1959–60 Rugby Football League season was the 65th season of rugby league football played in England. The championship, which involved thirty teams, started in August 1959 and culminated in a finals play-off series in May 1960 which resulted in a championship final between Wigan and Wakefield Trinity.

Season summary
League Champions: Wigan (27–3 v Wakefield Trinity)
Challenge Cup Winners: Wakefield Trinity (38–5 v Hull)

A number of clubs complained to the Rugby Football League over BBC televising rugby league matches live on TV, stating that it was affecting attendances.

St. Helens won the Lancashire League, and Wakefield Trinity won the Yorkshire League. Warrington beat St. Helens 5–4 to win the Lancashire County Cup, and Featherstone Rovers beat Hull F.C. 15–14 to win the Yorkshire County Cup.

Championship
Final Standings

Play-offs

Final
The Championship Final was played between Joe Egan' Wigan outfit against Wakefield Trinity at 3 o'clock on a warm afternoon on Saturday, 21 May 1960 at Odsal Stadium, Bradford. A crowd of 83,190 turned out for the game which was refereed by Eric Clay (Leeds).

Wigan: 27 
Tries (5): Billy Boston (2), Eric Ashton (2), Bill Sayer
Goals: Fred Griffiths (6)

Wakefield Trinity: 3 
Try: Fred Smith

Challenge Cup

The 1959–60 Challenge Cup tournament ended in a final between Wakefield Trinity and Hull F.C. The match was played at Wembley Stadium before a crowd of 79,773, with Wakefield Trinity winning 38 – 5. Despite being on the losing team, Hull's hooker, Tommy Harris was awarded the Lance Todd Trophy for his man-of-the-match performance.

Neil Fox of Wakefield Trinity scored a Cup Final record 20 points (two tries and seven goals) in the final for Wakefield, a feat that would not be repeated for another 39 years 1999.

Kangaroo Tour

September until December also saw the appearance of the Australian team in England on their 1959–60 Kangaroo Tour. Other than the three test Ashes series against Great Britain (won 2–1 by Australia), the Kangaroos played 21 matches against club and county representative sides.

The Kangaroos were coached by "The Little Master" Clive Churchill and were captained by Welsh born Balmain Tigers fullback Keith Barnes.

As of 2017, this remains the last time that Great Britain or England won The Ashes on home soil.

Sources
1959–60 Northern Rugby Football League season at wigan.rlfans.com

1959 in English rugby league
1960 in English rugby league
Northern Rugby Football League seasons